The 1936 Pittsburgh Pirates season was the team's fourth season as a professional sports franchise and as a member of the National Football League (NFL). The team welcomed back head coach, Joe Bach who served his last year at the position (until returning in 1952). His team finished the season with the franchise's best record yet, at 6-6.

The Pirates played all of their home games at Forbes Field in Pittsburgh, Pennsylvania, except for one that was played at Point Stadium in Johnstown, Pennsylvania.

Offseason

1936 NFL Draft

Regular season

Schedule
{| class="wikitable" style="text-align:center"
|-
!style=""| Week
!style=""| Date
!style=""| Opponent
!style=""| Result
!style=""| Record
!style=""| Venue
|-style="background:#cfc"
! 1
| September 13
| Boston Redskins
| W 10–0
| 1–0
| Forbes Field
|-style="background:#cfc"
! 2
| 
| at Brooklyn Dodgers
| W 10–6
| 2–0
| Ebbets Field
|-style="background:#cfc"
! 3
| September 27
| New York Giants
| W 10–7
| 3–0
| Forbes Field
|-style="background:#fcc"
! 4
| October 4
| Chicago Bears
| L 9–27
| 3–1
| Forbes Field
|-style="background:#cfc"
! 6
| 
| Philadelphia Eagles
| W 17–0
| 4–1
| Forbes Field
|-style="background:#fcc"
! 6
| October 18
| at Chicago Bears
| L 7–26
| 4–2
| Wrigley Field
|-style="background:#fcc"
! 7
| October 25
| at Green Bay Packers
| L 10–38
| 4–3
| Wisconsin State Fair Park
|-style="background:#cfc"
! 8
| November 1
| Brooklyn Dodgers
| W 10–7
| 5–3
| Forbes Field
|-style="background:#cfc"
! 9
| 
| at Philadelphia Eagles
| W 6–0
| 6–3
| Point Stadium
|-style="background:#fcc"
! 9
| November 8
| at Detroit Lions
| L 3–28
| 6–4
| University of Detroit Stadium
|-style="background:#fcc"
! 10
| November 15
| at Chicago Cardinals
| L 6–14
| 6–5
| Wrigley Field
|-
! 11
|colspan="6"| Bye
|-style="background:#fcc"
! 12
| November 29
| at Boston Redskins| L 0–30
| 6–6
| Fenway Park
|-
! 13
|colspan="6"| Bye
|-style=""
|colspan="8"| Note: Intra-division opponents are in bold text.
|}

Standings

Game summaries

Week 1 (Sunday September 13, 1936): Boston Redskins

at Forbes Field, Pittsburgh, Pennsylvania

 Game time: 
 Game weather: 
 Game attendance: 15,622
 Referee:Scoring Drives: Pittsburgh – Kakasic 26 fumble run (Niccolai kick)
 Pittsburgh – FG Kakasic 30

Week 2 (Wednesday September 23, 1936): Brooklyn Dodgers

at Ebbets Field, Brooklyn, New York

 Game time: 
 Game weather: 
 Game attendance: 10,000
 Referee:Scoring Drives: Pittsburgh – Strutt 3 run (Niccolai kick)
 Pittsburgh – FG Niccolai 26
 Brooklyn – Franklin 19 run (kick failed)

Week 3 (Sunday September 27, 1936): New York Giants

at Forbes Field, Pittsburgh, Pennsylvania

 Game time: 
 Game weather: 
 Game attendance: 25,800
 Referee:Scoring Drives: Pittsburgh – Sortet 11 pass from Matesic (Niccolai kick)
 New York – Richards 59 lateral from Burnett after pass from Danowski (Sarausky kick)
 Pittsburgh – FG Niccolai 11

Week 4 (Sunday October 4, 1936): Chicago Bears

at Forbes Field, Pittsburgh, Pennsylvania

 Game time: 
 Game weather: 
 Game attendance: 29,000
 Referee:Scoring Drives: Chicago Bears – Karr 8 pass from Nagurski (Manders kick)
 Chicago Bears – Brumbaugh 14 pass from Molesworth (Nagurski kick)
 Chicago Bears – Karr 40 pass from Ronzani (kick failed)
 Chicago Bears – Johnsos 36 pass from Molesworth (Stydahar kick)
 Pittsburgh – Heller 4 pass from Gildea (Kakasic kick)
 Pittsburgh – Safety, Feathers tackled in end zone by Brett

Week 6 (Wednesday October 14, 1936): Philadelphia Eagles

at Forbes Field, Pittsburgh, Pennsylvania

 Game time: 
 Game weather: 
 Game attendance: 10,042
 Referee:Scoring Drives: Pittsburgh – Heller 16 pass from Matesic (Niccolai kick)
 Pittsburgh – Skoronski 19 pass from Matesic (Niccolai kick)
 Pittsburgh – FG Kakasic 36

Week 6 (Sunday October 18, 1936): Chicago Bears

at Wrigley Field, Chicago, Illinois

 Game time: 
 Game weather: 
 Game attendance: 20,000
 Referee:Scoring Drives: Chicago Bears – Feathers 2 run (kick blocked)
 Chicago Bears – Ronzani 38 pass from Brumbaugh (kick failed)
 Pittsburgh – Zaninelli 2 run (Niccolai kick)
 Chicago Bears – Nagurski 1 run (Manders kick)
 Chicago Bears – Feathers 8 run (Manders kick)

Week 7 (Sunday October 25, 1936): Green Bay Packers

at Wisconsin State Fair Park, Milwaukee, Wisconsin

 Game time: 
 Game weather: 
 Game attendance: 10,000
 Referee:Scoring Drives: Pittsburgh – FG Niccolai 30
 Green Bay – Laws 12 pass from Monnett (Engebretsen kick)
 Green Bay – Hutson 21 pass from Herber (Schwammel kick)
 Green Bay – P. Miller 2 run (Smith kick)
 Green Bay – McNally 28 interception (Hinkle kick)
 Green Bay – P. Miller 7 pass from McNally (McNally run)
 Green Bay – Hutson 11 pass from Herber (Schwammel kick)
 Pittsburgh – Karcis 1 run (Karcis run)

Week 8 (Sunday November 1, 1936): Brooklyn Dodgers

at Forbes Field, Pittsburgh, Pennsylvania

 Game time: 
 Game weather: 
 Game attendance: 10,000
 Referee:Scoring Drives: Pittsburgh – FG Niccolai 21
 Pittsburgh – Karcis 1 run (Niccolai kick)
 Brooklyn – Crayne 2 run (Kercheval kick)

Week 9 (Thursday November 5, 1936): Philadelphia Eagles

at Point Stadium, Johnstown, Pennsylvania

 Game time: 
 Game weather: 
 Game attendance: 7,891
 Referee:Scoring Drives: Pittsburgh – FG Niccolai 41
 Pittsburgh – FG Niccolai 31

Week 9 (Sunday November 8, 1936): Detroit Lions

at Titan Stadium, Detroit, Michigan

 Game time: 
 Game weather: 
 Game attendance: 20,000
 Referee:Scoring Drives: Pittsburgh – FG Niccolai 25
 Detroit – Caddel run (Clark kick)
 Detroit – Ebding pass from Clark (Clark kick)
 Detroit – Gutowsky run (Clark kick)
 Detroit – Peterson 84 run (Presnell kick)

Week 10 (Sunday November 15, 1936): Chicago Cardinals

at Wrigley Field, Chicago, Illinois

 Game time: 
 Game weather: 
 Game attendance: 3,856
 Referee:Scoring Drives: Chicago Cardinals – Grosvenor 9 run (Kellogg kick)
 Chicago Cardinals – Smith 38 pass from Vaughan (Kellogg kick)
 Pittsburgh – Heller 48 pass from Matesic (kick failed)

Week 12 (Sunday November 29, 1936): Boston Redskins

at Fenway Park, Boston, Massachusetts

 Game time: 
 Game weather: 
 Game attendance: 7,000
 Referee:Scoring Drives:'''

 Boston – Battles 2 run (Smith kick)
 Boston – FG Busich 14
 Boston – Carroll 35 interception (Busich kick)
 Boston – Tosi recovered fumble in end zone (Smith kick)
 Boston – Irwin 24 run (kick failed)

References

Pittsburgh Steelers seasons
Pittsburgh Pirates
Pittsburg Pir